Carlo Galli (born 1950) is an Italian political scientist and politician.

Born in Modena, Galli graduated in Philosophy from the University of Bologna in 1972, He was assistant professor of the History of Political Doctrines from 1978 and, from 1983 to 1999, associate professor of the History of Contemporary Political Thought at the Faculty of Political Sciences of the University of Bologna, of which he was director until 2003. From 2004 he taught at the Faculty of Letters and Philosophy of the same university.

He has also been a member of the Chamber of Deputies of the Italian parliament.

Research 
His research interests have been oriented in particular to modern and contemporary political thought. He published books and essays on the Frankfurt School, on French counterrevolutionary thinkers, and on Weber, Strauss, Voegelin, Löwith, and Schmitt, among others. He has also worked on some of the main concepts of politics, such as "authority", "representation", "technique", "State", "war", and so on. Galli is currently working on the relationship between war and politics, analyzed from a theoretical, historical and practical point of view.

References

Italian political scientists
Italian politicians
1950 births
Living people